Tetrisphere is a puzzle video game developed by H2O Entertainment and published by Nintendo for the Nintendo 64. It was released in North America on August 11, 1997, and in PAL regions in February 1998. The game, originally named Phear, was slated for release on the Atari Jaguar in early 1995, but was reworked into a Tetris game for the N64 after Nintendo obtained its publishing rights. 

Tetrisphere is a variant on Tetris in which various shapes are shifted across a wrapped three-dimensional grid resembling a sphere, and then destroyed. The objective of the game changes depending on the mode but generally consists of removing layers of shapes to reach the playing field's core. Despite very little domestic advertising, Tetrisphere enjoyed moderately good sales and a mostly favorable critical reception. Reviewers praised the game's originality and the musical score composed by Neil Voss.

Gameplay 

In most Tetris titles, a player's score is incremented as a result of completing "lines", where a row of brick pieces that is without gaps is removed from the 2D playing field. This both earns points and removes the completed row, making room for further pieces. However, in Tetrisphere, the goal is instead to remove bricks by forcing three of the same type of piece to touch as a result of a "drop". A drop is achieved when any brick falls, either as a direct result of the player releasing the currently held brick or when the brick which supports it from below is removed by any method. When three bricks of the same type touch, this triggers a "combo". When a combo occurs, the three bricks will glow brightly and implode, removing themselves from the field of play. Any other same-shaped blocks which are touching that combo will also be removed in a chain combo. For example, if a player has lines of nested "Z" pieces, and then drops another "Z" directly on top of one of the nested "Z"s, the one which was dropped will cause the piece below to implode, in turn causing all identical pieces touching that piece to explode, and so on. The only exception is that the pieces involved (including the original three) must abide by the rules which dictate which pieces are "touching". For example, any two matching pieces which are stacked must be exactly on top of each other, if they are both to be removed. Laterally, each piece obeys the rules specific to its shape. As an illustration of this point, "O" pieces (a 2 × 2 square, colored blue) and "I" pieces (a 3 × 1 or 1 × 3 rectangle, colored green or yellow) must have full contact on one side with one full side of another piece of the same shape, but all other pieces are considered "touching" if any part of them is in contact with another of the same shape.

To facilitate in combos, pieces can be moved by "sliding". A piece can be moved by sliding when the player lines up the shadow of the current piece they're holding with the same-shaped piece on the sphere. A mismatched shadow and piece cannot be moved this way. Pieces moved with sliding can move through and destroy crystal pieces, but they cannot pass through other pieces themselves.

After a combo is finished, some of the pieces at random on the sphere will start to glow; the number of pieces this affects is proportional to the size of the combo. Pieces that glow in this way are called "power pieces". A power piece possesses unique qualities compared to a normal piece:

 First, is that if a combo is started with a power piece, the combo takes longer to finish. This allows the player to start additional combos while the first one is still ongoing. This increases the combo count and gives the player to earn more points and magic.
 Second, is that a power piece can be slid "up" one layer on the sphere. This allows for power pieces to be very easily moved around the entire sphere, and also allows the player to set up gravity combos.
 Third, is that if a combo is started with a power piece, the player can then hold down the B button to slide the power piece just before it detonates and slide the power piece to start a new combo elsewhere on the sphere. This is called a "fuse combo".

The player can achieve higher scores by increasing the "combo multiplier". The combo multiplier indicates how much each combo is multiplied by when the combo is completed. The combo multiplier starts at 1x, and it has a maximum multiplier of 20x. It can be increased in the following ways:

 Gravity combo: By sliding pieces below one above it, a piece can fall due to gravity. If the piece falls and there are at least two other adjacent pieces of the same type, a gravity combo will start on its own without the need to normally drop a piece. The combo multiplier can be increased up to ten times this way.
 Fuse combo: By starting a combo with a power piece, the power piece can then be moved by sliding it over to start a new combo before it is removed on its own. The combo multiplier can be increased up to eleven times this way.

In the "Vs." modes (both against the CPU and against another human player), the combo multiplier serves an additional purpose by increasing the effective rate at which garbage is sent to the opponent.

If a combo results in 20 or more pieces being removed, no power pieces will appear on the sphere. Instead, the player will be rewarded with an item of "magic". Magic is an item that the player may employ at any time to remove large sections of the surface. If a player does not use their magic initially, any subsequent instance of obtaining magic will upgrade the magic they already have to the next item. Each type of magic has its own pattern of removal, area of effect, and drawbacks. Magic items are (from the lowest level to the highest level):

 Firecracker: Removes one small section of pieces.
 Dynamite: Removes multiple sections of pieces.
 Magnet: Constantly removes pieces while it is active. The player can choose to move the cursor around during this time, allowing them to selectively remove certain sections of the sphere. The player can also choose to keep the cursor stationary while the magnet is active so they can remove multiple layers of a small section of the sphere instead.
 Atom: Removes the entire top layer of the sphere.
 Bomb: Initially removes one section of pieces that is significantly greater in area than the firecracker. A second explosion then results that destroys additional pieces; its blast radius is similar to the firecracker.
 Raygun: Similar to the magnet in how it removes pieces, but it is much more efficient than the magnet at doing so.

If a player has the Raygun and then achieves another magic reward, there is no further upgrade.

While the player is scrutinizing the playfield searching for likely combos, a blue timer called the "speed meter" slowly counts down. When the speed meter reaches zero, a new yellow timer starts and the player begins to move towards the sphere at an increasingly fast pace (moving back to the default position for each piece dropped). That timer may also expire, causing a new and final red timer to begin, which moves the player towards the playfield even faster than the yellow timer. There is no penalty if the final timer reaches zero, but if the player gets too close to the playfield, the piece is automatically dropped. The speed meter is slightly refilled for every piece removed, and the rate at which it depletes increases in later levels.

A player starts the round with three lives (represented as hearts). A life is lost each time a player drops a piece without starting a combo. Whenever a life is lost, any unused magic is lost, the combo multiplier resets to 1x, and the speed meter resets to a full blue timer. If three lives are lost, the round results in a game over. 

There are several modes of play available in Tetrisphere. The main single-player mode is "Rescue", which challenges the player to free a robot from the core of a sphere. As levels increase, the number of layers, size of the trapped robots, rate of speed meter depletion, and types of pieces present increase. "Hide and Seek" has the same objective, and consists of a mix of different challenges, such as exposing a picture imprinted on the sphere's core. The "Puzzle" mode removes the drop timer, the combo weapons, and the infinite and random natures of the pieces supplied to the player. Instead, players must remove all blocks from the surface of the globe, given a finite number of sliding moves and drops of select pieces. The "Vs. CPU" and the two-player "Vs. Player" feature split-screen race to reveal a number of core squares. "Time-Trial" and "Practice" modes, as well as a training tutorial, are also available. Finally, a hidden "Lines" mode exists, where pieces cannot be dropped. Instead, blocks implode by themselves if three of the same type are lined up with each other.

Development  

Tetrisphere was developed by H2O Entertainment, a game development company founded by Christopher Bailey, Michael Tam and Stephen Shatford, which was based in Calgary, Alberta, Canada. The project originally started as an Atari Jaguar game entitled Phear and was on display for playing at Atari Corporation's booth during the 1995 Winter CES, featuring gameplay similar to the "Tower" challenges found in the "Hide and Seek" mode of Tetrisphere, however, it involved the player in creating a hole of a specific size (3×2 for example) on the center of the sphere's core in order to progress into the next level. Nintendo reportedly secured the rights to Phear after seeing the game showcased at WCES '95, and it was announced as a Nintendo 64 game at Nintendo Space World that same year. H2O, which had completed a reverse takeover with Canadian Entech Resources Inc., began working exclusively for Nintendo during the game's development.

Around the time the company went public, Nintendo announced that Tetrisphere would be released in October 1996, boosting the company's stock. This didn't work for the partners in H2O, though. "That was the first they had heard of the release date," the Canadian Business magazine said. The company strove to finish the game by October, but that wasn't found to be feasible. The delay significantly hurt H2O's stock. "In terms of credibility and how investors perceived us, it really hurt us," partner Michaal Tam said. Once the planned release date had passed, Nintendo assigned six employees (approximately half a department) to the team.

Nintendo also imposed strict conditions upon the developer. "We weren't able to disclose any information," H2O developer Michael Tam said.

The game was developed on Silicon Graphics Indy, Indigo and O2 workstations. The graphics were created with SoftImage running on Indigo and O2 workstations. The game was written in the C programming language and compiled to target 'Ultra64' development boxes for testing and bug tracking.

Senior developers improved the engine so that only part of the sphere is visible at any time, thus reducing the render load on the N64 hardware. The framerate was increased, allowing for a two-player mode not present in the first version.

Stephen Shatford was the Sr. Game Designer and Tetris creator Alexey Pajitnov contributed to the game's design while working at Microsoft. The North American release of Tetrisphere was ultimately delayed until August 1997, when it became the first puzzle game available on the Nintendo 64.

The techno-style soundtrack for Tetrisphere was composed by Neil Voss using FastTracker 2 on a Pentium PC. He began the project as a freelancer when it was on the Jaguar, then signed on as an audio director when it moved to the Nintendo 64. Voss was the sole producer, composer, and sound engineer, but had help from in-house programmer David Pridie and staff from Silicon Graphics. Beginning with a cyberpunk style, the team transitioned to the techno genre due to the "uniqueness" of Tetrisphere as a puzzle game. Voss explained that Tetrisphere features only stereophonic sound because "[...] for a game where the action is all around you, it could enhance gameplay and the immersive experience." Voss was also able to simulate surround sound.

The composer frequently used samples during production, specifically in the tracks "Extol", "Martist", and "Hallucid"; for instance, "Extol" uses a chorus of Balinese singers from a stock sample CD. The song titles were chosen as they would be if released on an album. Voss elaborated, "'Azule Lux' was supposed to be 'blue light' relating to one of the level backgrounds that impressed me visually. 'Snowy Mushrooms' is a drug reference and equally a reference to Nintendo's penchant for mushroom imagery. 'Phony' is because I felt that track was too close to Liam Howlett's (of the Prodigy) (me being phony). 'Extol' means to praise, which I felt was appropriate... Things like that."

Reception 

Tetrisphere received "generally favorable” reviews according to the review aggregation website GameRankings based on nine reviews. Critics widely praised the innovative design, numerous and engrossing modes of play, and funky soundtrack with the ability for the player to select which track is played. Jer Horwitz wrote in GameSpot that Tetrisphere "is precisely the sort of game that the Nintendo 64 really needs, offering revolutionary gameplay, impressive long-term value, and a set of visual effects that go above and beyond what Sony's PlayStation can handle."

The graphics were also generally well-regarded. Horwitz, who saw the game's demo as Phear at the Consumer Electronics Show, was particularly impressed with how much the graphics had been improved over the original Jaguar version, noting the smooth spheres and moving 3D backgrounds. Next Generation dissented with the majority, stating that "Graphically, Tetrisphere doesn't live up to most other Nintendo 64 games - the most obvious flaw is an annoying pop-up as the player rotates the globe."

Though they agreed that it is innovative, critics had varying experiences with the gameplay. Next Generation and GamePro both said the gameplay's complexity and unprecedented mechanics make it difficult to learn, but ultimately more rewarding. GamePro said that "it actually requires a completely new mental discipline - which is just what the aging Tetris franchise needs." GameSpot and Shawn Smith and Crispin Boyer of Electronic Gaming Monthly both contended that while mastery of the game is a challenge, Tetrisphere is enjoyable even without learning the nuances of its strategy. Smith and Boyer's co-reviewer Dan Hsu instead said that mastering the game is impossible, since its 3D nature makes it impractical to get a full view of the field under the time constraints, and that tackling the puzzles blindly is boring. IGNs Doug Perry simply commented that "Puzzler fanatics, however, may want to steer clear of this game for fear of permanent addiction."

The game was distributed for sale among a network of 17,000 retailers in North America and Europe. Despite little advertising in the United States, Tetrisphere managed to sell 335,000 copies in the region between its August release date and December 31, 1997. Out of 42 titles, Tetrisphere ranked at number 27 in terms of sales for Nintendo games in 1997. H2O Entertainment announced that the game had sold 430,000 copies worldwide as of March 31, 1998.

Nintendo Power ranked Tetrisphere at number 50 on its list of "100 Best Nintendo Games of All Time" in September 1997. The magazine also gave it an award for "Best Soundtrack" for its annual awards for that year. IGN considered the game's soundtrack to be the fourth best of any N64 game.

References

External links 
 Tetrisphere at GameFAQs
 Tetrisphere at Giant Bomb
 Tetrisphere at MobyGames

1997 video games
Cancelled Atari Jaguar games
H2O Entertainment games
Multiplayer and single-player video games
Nintendo games
Nintendo 64 games
Nintendo 64-only games
Puzzle video games
Tetris
Video games developed in Canada
Video games scored by Neil Voss